Michael Dennis Henry (August 15, 1936 – January 8, 2021) was an American football linebacker and actor. He was best known for his role as Tarzan in the 1960s trilogy and as Junior in the Smokey and the Bandit film series.

Football career
Henry attended Bell High School in Los Angeles, where his play caught the attention of USC Trojans alum John Ferraro, who arranged for him to get a tryout at USC. He attended USC and was co-captain of the 1957 USC Trojans football team.

Acting career
Henry's most prominent role was as Tarzan in three 1960s movies Tarzan and the Valley of Gold (1966), Tarzan and the Great River (1967), and Tarzan and the Jungle Boy (1968) that were all filmed back-to-back in 1965. At the time, critics said the dark-haired, square-jawed, muscular Henry resembled classic illustrations of the apeman more than any other actor who had taken on the role. Henry turned down the lead of the subsequent Tarzan television series, which then went to Ron Ely.

Henry is probably best known to movie audiences for playing Jackie Gleason's character's dim-witted son "Junior" in the highly popular Smokey and the Bandit comedies, starring Burt Reynolds and Sally Field.

Henry portrayed a corrupt prison guard in The Longest Yard (1974). Henry played Sergeant Kowalski in The Green Berets (1968), Luke Santee in More Dead Than Alive (1968), and corrupt Sheriff "Blue Tom" Hendricks in Rio Lobo (1970). He also acted with Charlton Heston in three films: the football movie Number One (1969), Skyjacked (1972), and Soylent Green (1973).

Henry played Lt. Col. Donald Penobscot in an episode of the television series M*A*S*H. In another football-oriented role, he portrayed Tatashore, one of the members of the gang who kidnap Larry Bronco (Larry Csonka) in the "One of Our Running Backs Is Missing" episode of The Six Million Dollar Man.

Personal life
Henry and his wife Cheryl Henry, were married in 1984. Together they had a daughter, Shannon Noble.

Illness and death
After being diagnosed with Parkinson's disease, he retired from acting in 1988. Henry died on January 8, 2021, at the age of 84 at Providence Saint Joseph Medical Center in Burbank, California, after years of complications from both Parkinson's disease and chronic traumatic encephalopathy.

Filmography
Curfew Breakers (1957) as Reagan
General Hospital (1963, TV Series) as Rudolpho (1988)
Spencer's Mountain (1963) as Spencer Brother (uncredited)
Palm Springs Weekend (1963) as Doorman (uncredited)
Tarzan and the Valley of Gold (1966) as Tarzan
Tarzan and the Great River (1967) as Tarzan
Tarzan and the Jungle Boy (1968) as Tarzan
The Green Berets (1968) as Sergeant Kowalski
More Dead Than Alive (1968) as Luke Santee
Number One (1969) as Walt Chaffee
Rio Lobo (1970) as Sheriff Tom Hendricks
Walt Disney's Wonderful World of Color (1972) as Fargo
Skyjacked (1972) as Sam Allen
Soylent Green (1973) as Kulozik
The Longest Yard (1974) as Rassmeusen
Mean Johnny Barrows (1976) as Carlo Da Vince
Adiós Amigo (1976) as Mary's Husband
No Way Back (1976) as Goon #3
Smokey and the Bandit (1977) as Junior Justice
M*A*S*H (1977, TV Series) as Donald Penobscot
Smokey and the Bandit II (1980) as Junior Justice
Fantasy Island (1981, TV Series) as Mike
Smokey and the Bandit Part 3 (1983) as Junior Justice 
Outrageous Fortune (1987) as Russian #1

References

External links 

 Mike Henry at Brian's Drive-In Theater

1936 births
2021 deaths
Players of American football from Los Angeles
American football linebackers
USC Trojans football players
Pittsburgh Steelers players
Los Angeles Rams players
American male television actors
American male film actors
Deaths from chronic traumatic encephalopathy
Deaths from Parkinson's disease